The Asian Philosophical Association is a philosophical organization whose purpose is to promote the study of Asian philosophies and interpretations of these philosophies. The organization holds annual meetings and publishes the International Journal of the Asian Philosophical Association.

External links 
Asian Philosophical Association website

Philosophy organizations
Organizations based in Asia